The 1974 Soviet Chess Championship was the 42nd edition of USSR Chess Championship. Held from 30 November to 23 December 1974 in Leningrad. The tournament was won by Alexander Beliavsky and Mikhail Tal.

Table and results

References 

USSR Chess Championships
Championship
Chess
1974 in chess
Chess